Samir Gurbanov (born on 12 March 2001) is an Azerbaijani professional footballer who plays as a winger.

Club career
On 11 May 2019, Gurbanov made his debut in the Azerbaijan Premier League for Gabala match against Sumgayit.

On 24 August 2019, it was announced that Gurbanov had joined Czech club FK Viktoria Žižkov on loan.

Honours
Gabala
Azerbaijan Cup (1): 2018–19

References

External links
 

2001 births
Living people
Azerbaijani footballers
Azerbaijani expatriate footballers
Association football defenders
Azerbaijan youth international footballers
Azerbaijan Premier League players
Gabala FC players
FK Viktoria Žižkov players
Kapaz PFK players
Zira FK players
Shamakhi FK players
Azerbaijani expatriate sportspeople in the Czech Republic
Expatriate footballers in the Czech Republic